The Jewell Motor Car Company of Massillon, Ohio, formerly the Forest City Motor Car Company, manufactured the Jewell brass era automobile from 1906 to 1909.

History
A prototype automobile was built by Forest City Motor Car Company but investors moved to Massillon and renamed the car the Jewell. The Jewell was a single-cylinder high-wheeler of 8 to 10hp. In 1908 the marque name was changed to Jewel and a 40hp Rutenber 4-cylinder car was added. In 1909 the company name was changed to Jewel Motor Car Company but by the end of the year the company was reorganized as the Croxton-Keeton Motor Company and the Jewel name was dropped.

References

Motor vehicle manufacturers based in Ohio
Defunct motor vehicle manufacturers of the United States
Cars introduced in 1905
Companies based in Cleveland
Vehicle manufacturing companies established in 1905
Vehicle manufacturing companies disestablished in 1909
Defunct manufacturing companies based in Ohio
Massillon, Ohio
1905 establishments in Ohio
1909 disestablishments in Ohio
Brass Era vehicles
Highwheeler
1900s cars